This is about the Filipino novel.  For the music album, see More Than Conquerors.

More Than Conquerors is a second novel by Filipino author Edilberto K. Tiempo.
The novel first appeared in 1959 in the pages of Weekly Women’s Magazine. It was first published in book format in 1964.

Description
With the Filipino resistance movement during the Second World War employed as “background” of the novel, the focus of the narrative is Andres, a lawyer, and his two brothers.  The three brothers were tortured by the Japanese occupiers by means of the horizontal spread-eagle "crucifixion" method.  The brothers’ predicament echoed a similarity to “the Christ figure in the midst of temptation and at Calvary”.

References

External links
Other books by Edilberto Tiempo

1959 novels
Philippine novels
Novels set during World War II
Novels set in the Philippines